Pine Lake is a town in Oneida County, Wisconsin. The population was 2,720 at the time of the 2000 census. The unincorporated community of Roosevelt is located in the town.

Recreation
A rural, "Northwoods" forest-land, Pine Lake is home to both the Crystal Lake Scout Reservation and the annual Hodag Country Music Festival.

Geography
According to the United States Census Bureau, the town has a total area of 45.0 square miles (116.6 km2), of which, 40.6 square miles (105.2 km2) of it is land and 4.4 square miles (11.4 km2) of it (9.80%) is water.

Demographics
As of the census of 2000, there were 2,720 people, 1,063 households, and 755 families residing in the town. The population density was 67.0 people per square mile (25.9/km2). There were 1,381 housing units at an average density of 34.0 per square mile (13.1/km2). The racial makeup of the town was 97.46% White, 0.96% African American, 0.74% Native American, 0.33% Asian, 0.11% from other races, and 0.40% from two or more races. Hispanic or Latino of any race were 0.59% of the population.

There were 1,063 households, out of which 29.4% had children under the age of 18 living with them, 61.7% were married couples living together, 6.3% had a female householder with no husband present, and 28.9% were non-families. 23.0% of all households were made up of individuals, and 8.7% had someone living alone who was 65 years of age or older. The average household size was 2.45 and the average family size was 2.88.

In the town, the population was spread out, with 22.6% under the age of 18, 7.3% from 18 to 24, 29.0% from 25 to 44, 28.9% from 45 to 64, and 12.1% who were 65 years of age or older. The median age was 40 years. For every 100 females, there were 109.7 males. For every 100 females age 18 and over, there were 111.0 males.

The median income for a household in the town was $43,750, and the median income for a family was $49,500. Males had a median income of $36,413 versus $23,272 for females. The per capita income for the town was $21,515. About 4.2% of families and 7.4% of the population were below the poverty line, including 11.2% of those under age 18 and 10.7% of those age 65 or over.

Government

Transportation
The Rhinelander–Oneida County Airport (KRHI) serves Pine Lake, the county and surrounding communities with both scheduled commercial jet service and general aviation services.

References

External links
Town of Pine Lake, Wisconsin website

Towns in Oneida County, Wisconsin
Towns in Wisconsin